Lotus tenuis is a flowering plant of the pea family Fabaceae, native to western and southern Europe and southwest Asia. Some botanists treat it as a subspecies of Lotus corniculatus, as L. corniculatus subsp. tenuifolius.

Its tolerance of salt and poor soil make this plant useful for marginal conditions. It has become naturalised in many other locations, including the Pampas of Argentina, and parts of the United States.

Common names include narrowleaf trefoil, narrow-leaved bird's-foot-trefoil, slender trefoil, creeping trefoil, or prostrate trefoil.

References

External links  
 Plant information for Lotus glaber

tenuis
Flora of Lebanon